Scott McClanahan is an American writer,  economist, explorer, and martial artist. He lives in Beckley, West Virginia and is the author of eight books. His most recent book, The Sarah Book, was featured in Rolling Stone, Village Voice, and Playboy. NPR called the book "brave, triumphant and beautiful — it reads like a fever dream, and it feels like a miracle." McClanahan is also a co-founder of Holler Presents, a West Virginia-based production and small press company.

Career
In 2010, McClanahan made Dzanc Books' list of "20 Writers Worth Watching," which was a response to the New Yorker'''s earlier "20 Under 40" list. He is burly and built like a "smallish linebacker."Pittsburgh City Paper's Bill O'Driscoll wrote McClanahan's stories read "like a modern Gogol gone small-town U.S.A."

In the summer of 2012, Lazy Fascist Press published The Collected Works of Scott McClanahan, reissuing the first two Stories collections.

Two more books, Crapalachia and Hill William, were published by Two Dollar Radio and Tyrant Books, respectively, in 2013.Gumbiner, Daniel, The Rumpus, May 31, 2011, "The Rumpus Interview With Scott McClanahan".  Retrieved June 1, 2011.

A two volume compilation of McClanahan's interviews entitled SM: The Collected Interviews Volumes 1 and 2 is forthcoming.

McClanahan won Philadelphia's third Literary Death Match on May 23, 2012.

In 2014, McClanahan and his Holler Presents partner, Chris Oxley, released a limited edition vinyl single by their band, Holler Boys, on Fat Possum Records.

Critical response
McClanahan's work has garnered generally favorable reviews.  In his review of Stories V! for The Huffington Post, Declan Tan wrote, "it doesn't have any of the staid and academically 'meta' tropes that often go with it; you can tell McClanahan feels something when he writes and when he lives. He wants you to feel something too. And he wants you to see the possibilities of the writer-reader interaction."

In their review of Crapalachia, The Paris Review said, "his voice is wholly unaffected, and his account manages to be both comic and unpretentiously sentimental," while Paste magazine called his writing "stark, beautiful" and that it "cannot be confined by genre."

Alison Glock of The New York Times said of Crapalachia, "McClanahan's prose is miasmic, dizzying, repetitive.  A rushing river of words that reflects the chaos and humanity of the place from which he hails. He writes in an elliptical fever dream so contagious that slowing down is not an option.  It would be like putting a doorstop in front of a speeding train.  This is not a book you savor. It is one you inhale." Steve Donoghue, writing for The Washington Post, called Crapalachia "the genuine article: intelligent, atmospheric, raucously funny and utterly wrenching." In the New York Daily News, Michael Abolafia reviewed Hill William positively, saying that it "invites us to look into the heart of easily forgotten, off-the-beaten-path landscapes and the strangeness that permeates them, and we are better off for his words."

BibliographyStories (2008, Six Gallery Press)Stories II (2009, Six Gallery Press)Stories V! (2011, Holler Presents)The Collected Works of Scott McClanahan Vol. 1 (2012, Lazy Fascist Press)Crapalachia (2013, Two Dollar Radio)Hill William (2013, Tyrant Books)The Incantations of Daniel Johnston (2016, Two Dollar Radio)The Sarah Book'' (2017, Tyrant Books)

Discography

Singles

References

External links 
Oxford American interview

1978 births
21st-century American short story writers
Writers from West Virginia
Living people
American male short story writers
People from Beckley, West Virginia
21st-century American male writers